Önder Çengel (born 21 July 1982) is a Turkish-Swiss former professional footballer who played as a striker.

At the start of the 2004–05 season, Turkish champion Fenerbahçe tried Önder and Gökhan İnler in the season start training camp in Germany, but coach Christoph Daum declared that both players could not play for Fenerbahçe.

Although wearing shirt no.7, he just made two unused sub appearances for Diyarbakırspor in April 2005.

He signed a three-year contract with Gaziantepspor in summer 2007. On 15 February 2007, he signed for FC Winterthur. He is transfer to Karşıyaka in 2008.

References

External links
 
 
 Profile at TFF
 Karşıyakaspor Official Web Site

1982 births
Living people
Association football forwards
Swiss men's footballers
Swiss Super League players
Turkish emigrants to Switzerland
Turkish expatriate sportspeople in Switzerland
Swiss people of Turkish descent
FC Baden players
Yverdon-Sport FC players
FC Winterthur players
Grasshopper Club Zürich players
Diyarbakırspor footballers
FC Wil players
FC Thun players
Gaziantepspor footballers
Kartalspor footballers
Elazığspor footballers
Şanlıurfaspor footballers
Pendikspor footballers
Eyüpspor footballers
Switzerland under-21 international footballers